Abdulali bey Amirjanov Shirali bey oghlu (1870–1948) was an Azerbaijani statesman who served as Minister of Finance, State Controller of Azerbaijan Democratic Republic, and was a member of Azerbaijani National Council and later Parliament of Azerbaijan.

Early years
Amirjanov was born in Shaki, Azerbaijan. He graduated from Alexander Pedagogical University in Tbilisi in 1888. He then worked as a teacher in Shaki and Lenkoran. Amirjanov was a member of Education Board of Nəşri-Maarif Education Society and chaired the Baku Muslim Charity Society Organization.

Political career
After establishment of the Azerbaijan Democratic Republic on May 28, 1918 Amirjanov was involved in political life of the country. On June 17, 1918, when the second cabinet of Azerbaijan Democratic Republic convened, Amirjanov was appointed Minister of Finance and served in the position until October 6, when the cabinet went through reshuffling and he was appointed State Controller. He held the office until December 7, 1918. Elected to the Azerbaijani parliament as an independent deputy, Amirjanov was a member of the finance-budgetary and census commissions. In order to enhance trade relations with other countries, he co-founded Dəyanət company. During Turkish Army of Islam's march on Baku in September 1918, Amirjanov along with Behbudkhan Javanshir were in the frontlines when Ələt was taken.

After takeover of Azerbaijan by Bolsheviks on April 28, 1920 Amirjanov immigrated to Turkey. He died in Istanbul in 1948.

See also
Azerbaijani National Council
Cabinets of Azerbaijan Democratic Republic (1918-1920)
Current Cabinet of Azerbaijan Republic

References

1870 births
1920 deaths
Azerbaijani Muslims
Azerbaijan Democratic Republic politicians
Finance ministers of Azerbaijan
Government ministers of Azerbaijan
People from Shaki, Azerbaijan
Azerbaijani anti-communists